Norway Township is the name of these civil townships in the U.S. state of Minnesota:
Norway Township, Fillmore County, Minnesota
Norway Township, Kittson County, Minnesota

See also

 Norway Township (disambiguation)

Minnesota township disambiguation pages